António Simões da Costa (born 14 December 1943), known as Simões, is a Portuguese former footballer who played as a left winger.

He spent 14 professional seasons with Benfica, playing 449 official games and scoring 72 goals. In the late 1970s, early 1980s, he represented several teams in the United States, and subsequently worked as a manager in both continents. A diminutive winger known for his high technicality, creativity and crossing ability, Simões still holds the record of youngest player (18 years and 139 days old) to play and win a final, the European Cup final won by Benfica against Real Madrid on 2 May 1962.

Simões played more than 40 times for Portugal, appearing with the country at the 1966 World Cup.

Club career

Benfica
Born in Corroios, Seixal, Setúbal, Simões joined S.L. Benfica when he was 15, and was already an important first-team member just two years later, being part of the squads that won ten national championships and one European Cup. In the 1962 final of the latter competition, a 5–3 win against Real Madrid, he became the youngest ever player to conquer the tournament, at 18 years and four months.

Simões left Benfica at the end of the 1974–75 season, after winning his last league. He contributed with 26 scoreless matches in the process.

United States
Simões moved to the United States at the age of 32, signing with the Boston Minutemen of the North American Soccer League. He spent two seasons in the city before moving to the San Jose Earthquakes in 1976, and subsequently the Dallas Tornado.

In 1979, Simões joined the Detroit Lightning of the Major Indoor Soccer League. After one season he moved to the Chicago Horizon, before finishing his career at almost 39 with the Kansas City Comets; he returned twice to his country during the off-season period, briefly representing G.D. Estoril Praia and U.F.C.I. Tomar.

Immediately after quitting football, Simões was hired as coach of the Phoenix Inferno of the MISL. He was dismissed in March 1984 and replaced by Ted Podleski, joining the Las Vegas Americans as assistant to Alan Mayer afterwards and also leaving in January 1985; in 1989, he was the SISL indoor season coach of the year with the Austin Sockadillos.

International career
Simões made his debut with the Portugal national team on 6 May 1962, in a 1–2 friendly defeat with Brazil in São Paulo. He was a member of the squad that finished in third place in the 1966 World Cup in England, scoring the opener in the group stage opener against the same opponent (3–1 win).

The recipient of 46 caps with three goals, Simões missed the Brazil Independence Cup due to injury. He made his last appearance on 13 October 1973, in a 2–2 home draw against Bulgaria for the 1974 World Cup qualifiers.

Simões joined Iran's coaching staff in April 2011, acting as assistant to compatriot Carlos Queiroz. He left in February 2014, due to personal reasons.

|}

Honours
Benfica
Primeira Divisão: 1962–63, 1963–64, 1964–65, 1966–67, 1967–68, 1968–69, 1970–71, 1971–72, 1972–73, 1974–75
Taça de Portugal (4)
European Cup: 1961–62
Intercontinental Cup runner-up: 1961, 1962

Portugal
UEFA European Under-18 Championship: 1961
FIFA World Cup third place: 1966

References

Further reading

External links

NASL/MISL profile

1943 births
Living people
People from Seixal
Portuguese footballers
Association football wingers
Primeira Liga players
Liga Portugal 2 players
S.L. Benfica footballers
G.D. Estoril Praia players
U.F.C.I. Tomar players
American Soccer League (1933–1983) players
North American Soccer League (1968–1984) players
Major Indoor Soccer League (1978–1992) players
Boston Minutemen players
San Jose Earthquakes (1974–1988) players
New Jersey Americans (ASL) players
Dallas Tornado players
Detroit Lightning players
Chicago Horizons players
Kansas City Comets (original MISL) players
UEFA Champions League winning players
Portugal youth international footballers
Portugal international footballers
1966 FIFA World Cup players
Portuguese expatriate footballers
Expatriate soccer players in the United States
Portuguese expatriate sportspeople in the United States
Portuguese football managers
Major Indoor Soccer League (1978–1992) coaches
USISL coaches
Portuguese expatriate sportspeople in Iran
S.C. Lusitânia managers
Sportspeople from Setúbal District
Portuguese expatriate football managers
Expatriate soccer managers in the United States
Expatriate football managers in Iran